Cedric Harold Firth (22 May 1908–31 May 1994) was a New Zealand builder, architect and writer. He was born in Auckland, Auckland, New Zealand on 22 May 1908.

From 1948 to 1959 he was in a partnership 'Plishke & Firth' with Ernst Plischke.

References

1908 births
1994 deaths
New Zealand writers
Writers from Auckland
20th-century New Zealand architects